Centrolene azulae is a species of frog in the family Centrolenidae. It is threatened by habitat loss, and is enlisted in the IUCN red list.

Endemic to Peru, its natural habitats are subtropical or tropical moist montane forests and rivers. It was originally described in the genus Centrolenella, until 1993.

References

azulae
Amphibians of Peru
Taxonomy articles created by Polbot